Peter Mandl is a Swedish sculptor. He was born in 1947 in Prague in the then Czechoslovakia.

When the Soviet Union invaded Prague in 1968, Peter and his family fled to Sweden. Peter now resides with his wife Gunilla in Påarp in the outskirts of Halmstad.

Much of Peter's art is on general viewing around Sweden. His beautiful women crafted in bronze and glass shapes that are reminiscent of the sea and wind can be seen in many galleries, especially in Scandinavia.

References

External links

 Peter Mandl's website

1947 births
Swedish male sculptors
Living people